7 is the eighth studio album by Swedish singer Sanna Nielsen, released in Sweden on 30 June 2014 by Warner Music. It was preceded by the lead single "Undo " on 23 February 2014. The album debuted at number one in Sweden.

The title refers to the number of attempts it took Nielsen to win Melodifestivalen and earn the right to represent Sweden in the Eurovision Song Contest, which had been an ambition of hers for many years.

Promotion
From July 1–10, Nielsen promoted and signed copies of the album in Skansen, Svenljunga, Sölvesborg, Löddeköpinge, Gullbranna, Kosta, Göteborg, Uddevalla, Luleå, Trollhättan, Gullbranna, Kringlan and Södertälje.

On July 14, Nielsen performed at "Victoriadagen" (Victoria Day), which is the celebration of Her Royal Highness Crown Princess Victoria’s birthday.

Critical reception
Peter Dunwoody of 'ESC Xtra' gave the album 7/10, saying: "the album is 'mid-tempo' and 'middle-of-the-road' and while the production is more electronic than in her previous albums, many of the songs could have happily existed ten years ago."  He continued saying "there are very few adventurous moments but the highlights are very satisfying pure pop. The big triumph of the album is the production: it’s crisp, it’s big, and it’s just so Swedish"
 
Daniel Tew of 'Eurovisionista' said: "Overall, 7 is a collection of songs which flows well and is consistent in its strength. The pop pedigree behind the album is impeccable and the songs contained in it have hit potential" but said "the main downfall of the 7 as an album is the fact that it only contains nine tracks."

Zachary Thomas of 'wiwibloggs' gave the album 9.5/10, saying: "Overall, this album is spectacular and cleverly showcases Sanna in a variety of styles. “Breathe” includes a dub-step backing, and a catchy build-up to the chorus; “All About Love” has a slight Latin flare; “Trouble” is a tad eclectic, and “Ready” is a feel good, up-tempo track that makes you want to sway and clap along".

Track listing

Notes
 signifies an additional producer

Charts

Release history

References

External links

2014 albums
Sanna Nielsen albums
Albums produced by David Kreuger
Albums produced by Per Magnusson